Robert Rolle may refer to:

Robert Rolle (died 1660) (1622–1660), Member of Parliament for Devon during the Protectorate
Robert Rolle (died 1710), Member of Parliament for Devon